Derek O'Brien (born 11 September 1957 in Dublin) is a retired Irish footballer who played in the League of Ireland during the 1980s.

O'Brien was a right back who played for Bohemians, Dundalk, Shamrock Rovers, Athlone Town, Longford Town and Home Farm F.C. He represented Ireland at youth level and made 28 league appearances for Bohs.

Derek played in all four European games during his time at Oriel Park, in ties against PSV Eindhoven and Hajduk Split.

He signed for Rovers in the 1981 close season where he stayed for 2 seasons.

He is the brother of Fran O'Brien and Ray O'Brien, son of Fran O'Brien Senior, (Drumcondra F.C.) and father of Mark and Colin.

Honours
 FAI Cup
 Dundalk F.C.

References

 The Hoops by Paul Doolan and Robert Goggins

1957 births
Living people
Association football midfielders
Republic of Ireland association footballers
Bohemian F.C. players
Shamrock Rovers F.C. players
Dundalk F.C. players
Athlone Town A.F.C. players
Home Farm F.C. players
League of Ireland players
Republic of Ireland youth international footballers